The End is a 2007 Canadian dark comedy thriller horror film written and directed by Jeremy Thomas, who also stars in the film. Thomas himself called his first feature a "lighthearted existential horror film", while four festival reviewers described it in neo-noir terms. Having won over critics, and an award from the Eugene International Film Festival, Thomas was able to attract investors for his next project, Ally Was Screaming.

Synopsis
Sixteen years ago, a teenage Joseph Rickman (Jeremy Thomas) found a missing girl on sheer intuition, seeing something that others could not. Rickman, now a charismatic schoolteacher, has since come to the conclusion that everything in life has been predetermined, including his own life, and can point to many signs which appear to suggest if not confirm it. He tries to explain himself to those close to him, who treat him as though he may be developing paranoid schizophrenia, as his father did many years ago. An exception to this response is an adoring student, Katie (Katie Webber), who seems to share some of his psychic abilities. Even so, sometimes he, too, thinks he is losing his mind.  As his mental state deteriorates, he has a growing sense of dread.

Feeling compelled to walk into the woods one night, he sees a robed, limping man in a tragedy mask and images of people being kidnapped and buried alive as strange little beings look on. A stranger in strange clothing has in fact been seen lurking the dark streets in town at about the times that people have been inexplicably disappearing. Confiding in his long-time friend, Detective Clara Wilkie (Ella B. May), the pair become convinced that what he has seen are visionary premonitions, and they work on the case together, which involves not only multiple kidnapping but serial murder. Tensions increase between them as they spend more time together, and as her feelings for Rickman grow, she is increasingly concerned about his mounting obsession as the case edges delicately towards a bizarre and shocking conclusion.

Cast
Jeremy Thomas as Joseph Rickman
Ella B. May as Clara Wilkie
Katie Webber as Katie
Darren MacDonald as The Figure • Lobotomized Man • Activator Scientist

Production

Background and filming
Before shooting his first feature film, Jeremy Thomas had made short films as a student at the University of Calgary, where he joined the campus station NUTV to use the equipment, just as director Michael Dowse was leaving. The End was shot on video.

Financing
A low-budget film, The End was largely self-financed, though it did receive support from the National Film Board's Filmmaker Assistance Program. At the 2008 Fantasia International Film Festival, Thomas was apparently apologetic about the film, offering what seemed like "excuses or explanations – they had less money than the short film that precedes it, but it is long for a zero-budget indie," among other details.

Release
The End had its premiere at the Calgary International Film Festival on 24 September 2007. Its American premiere was at the 2008 Cinequest Film Festival, an official selection. The film was also screened at Fantasia, the Edmonton International Film Festival, the Eugene International Film Festival (where it won an award), and the International Film Festival of England.

Home media and streaming
The End is available on DVD and for streaming from IndiePlaya.

Reception

Critical response
The End generally received "great" reviews at film festivals and led to Thomas attracting producers for his next film, Ally Was Screaming. Appreciative critics were "tying themselves in knots not to reveal its mid-plot twist."

Simon Laperrière calls the film a "stunning appearance on the landscape of DIY cinema", a "gobsmacking cross" between Charlie Kaufman and William Shakespeare, and "unquestionably the most original Canadian film of the year." Pam Kelly, writing for the Edmonton Sun, agreed, suggesting that if Woody Allen, David Lynch and M. Night Shyamalan ever had a "forbidden love child," it may "look something like The End, a wolf in sheep's clothing that looks and feels like a modern noir, but ... which burns in flames any conventional relationship an audience has with fictional cinema."Thomas has created a notably insightful and thought provoking piece of work that is intricate and employs numerous twists and surprises serving up continuous adventure using equal parts horror, drama, thriller and mystery. This clever and refreshing film will have you utterly compelled right up to its artfully unexpected conclusion.Praising the acting and the film's originality, Mike Phalin said it "is a prime example of how ingenuity prevails in the face of obvious budgetary restraints"; a "pleasant surprise" and "an inspiration ... to the low budget/do-it-yourself filmmaking community." The first half of the film has "charm", and then "turns the screws on the viewers in a highly unexpected way."

Kevin Matthews avers The End "cannot be explained... It must be shown." It is difficult "to discuss any of the storyline's developments or the main plus points", because to do so would be "to ruin a sublime, surreal, cinematic joy." The film is "intelligent, often humorous", and "manages to both touch on themes that have been used effectively elsewhere and to provide something completely new to film fans."

Jay Seaver finds the opening of the film "kind of clunky", but notes that it has "one of the rare mid-thriller twists that makes the movie funnier rather than more grim." Thomas cleverly lays out some of the ideas he's going to be playing with early, and seems to have fun elaborating on his plot twist, "finding new ways to push things just a bit further as the movie goes on." As for the acting:Thomas isn't bad at all. At times, he seems a little artificial, but at others he seems real in an "I'd probably be a bit awkward in this situation, too" manner. Ella May is much the same, and the two of them are fun to watch together. It's a bit of a step down to the supporting characters, but it's a lot less painful than it is in other low-budget independents, because Thomas has done a good job of working around his limitations.It would be nice if the very end of the movie worked a bit better. It's clever, but somewhat underwhelming considering the build-up to it. Still, Jeremy Thomas has managed to make something nifty out of not very much in the way of resources.

Accolade
Best Horror/Sci-Fi Feature, Eugene International Film Festival (Eugene, Oregon, 2018)

References

External links
Trailer on YouTube

2007 films
2007 horror films
2007 black comedy films
2000s thriller films
Canadian drama films
Canadian horror thriller films
English-language Canadian films
2000s psychological drama films
Neo-noir
Films about psychic powers
2007 comedy films
2000s English-language films
2000s Canadian films